Michael Forster Patterson (7 January 194116 April 2002) was an Australian rules footballer and coach. Affectionately known as the "Swamp Fox", Patterson was a premiership ruckman with the Richmond Football Club in 1967, and also captain/coach of the 1972 Australian Champions, the North Adelaide Football Club.

Richmond
Patterson played for the Richmond Football Club between 1959 and 1969. When first choice ruck Neville Crowe was suspended for the 1967 grand final Patterson stepped up brilliantly to compete with legendary ruckman Polly Farmer and made a major contribution to Richmond's 9-point victory.

North Adelaide
In 1970 Patterson joined the North Adelaide Football Club as captain/coach with great success, hardening a champion side and leading the Roosters to SANFL premierships in 1971 and 1972. In 1972 he also led North Adelaide to national triumph in the Australian Championship, sealed with a 1-point victory over the Carlton Football Club.

After 1973 he retired as a player after a career of 18 years but remained as North Adelaide's coach until 1977.

St Kilda
He returned to the VFL as coach of St Kilda from 1978 until Round 2 of 1980. St Kilda collected the wooden spoon for the third time in three years in 1979. Former player and trucking millionaire Lindsay Fox had been brought into the club, as president, in 1979. One of his actions was to facilitate the signing of high-profile Alex Jesaulenko as an on-field player only. However this placed great pressure on Patterson's position as Jesaulenko had an established record as a captain-coach, having the year previously led Carlton to premiership victory.

During the Round 2 match two St Kilda players, in an attempt to win the ball, comically bumped into each other. Fox declared this indicated a lack of discipline that could no longer be tolerated. Patterson was sacked immediately for Jesaulenko.

Frankston
Patterson went on to coach the Frankston in the VFA from 1981 to 1983.

Richmond
Patterson returned home to Punt Road Oval in his final position as senior VFL coach of the Richmond Football Club for the 1984 season.

Death
Patterson died from a massive stroke on 16 April 2002, at the age of 61.

Honours
In 2001, shortly before his premature death, Mike Patterson, the first Victorian to steer an SANFL club to a premiership, was selected as coach of North Adelaide's official 'Team of the Twentieth Century'.

References

Bibliography
 Hogan P: The Tigers Of Old, Richmond FC, Melbourne 1996

External links

St Kilda Football Club coaches
Richmond Football Club players
Richmond Football Club Premiership players
North Adelaide Football Club players
Richmond Football Club coaches
North Adelaide Football Club coaches
Australian rules footballers from Victoria (Australia)
2002 deaths
1941 births
One-time VFL/AFL Premiership players